Ouchy is a port and a popular lakeside resort south of the centre of Lausanne in Switzerland, at the edge of Lake Geneva.

Facilities 
Very popular with tourists for the views of nearby France (Évian-les-Bains, Thonon), Ouchy is also a favorite area for rollerskating (Lausanne, and Ouchy in particular, is considered a capital for this sport) and for skateboarding.  The incredible views of the lake and the Alps, and the cooler air in summer have made Ouchy a popular place especially in the summer months.

There is a major cluster of hotels – the Beau-Rivage Palace, the Château d'Ouchy, the Mövenpick hotel, etc. – and restaurants around the port. It is served by Lausanne Metro Line 2 from Ouchy station. In 2015, the metro station "Ouchy" was renamed "Ouchy-Olympique" to mark the 100th anniversary of the installation of the International Olympic Committee in Lausanne.

The headquarters of the International Olympic Committee are at Vidy, to the west of Ouchy. The Olympic Museum and the Olympic Park (sculpture garden between the museum and the lake) are in Ouchy.

History 

Once a fishing village, Ouchy was incorporated into the city of Lausanne in the mid-19th century to serve as a port on Lake Geneva.

Links between the port and the city centre were improved in 1877 when Switzerland's first funicular opened. The line was converted to a rack railway in 1954, with a maintenance depot located at the Ouchy station. Eventually renamed Métro Lausanne-Ouchy, the line continued operating until 2006, when it was upgraded to become Lausanne Métro line 2.

On 18 October 1912, the First Treaty of Lausanne was signed in Ouchy between Italy and the Ottoman Empire, concluding the Italo-Turkish War.

Sport
FC Stade Lausanne-Ouchy are based in Ouchy. They gained promotion to the second tier of Swiss professional football in 2019.

In Literature

The plot of The Finishing School, a 2004 novel by Scottish author Muriel Spark, is set in 'College Sunrise', a finishing school located in Ouchy. In A Farewell to Arms by Ernest Hemingway, the two main characters, Lt. Frederic Henry and Catherine Barkley, take a cogwheel train into Ouchy to walk along Lake Geneva.

See also 
 Compagnie générale de navigation sur le lac Léman

References

External links 

 Page on the website of the City of Lausanne

Municipalities of the canton of Vaud
Lausanne
Populated places on Lake Geneva
Tourist attractions in Lausanne

de:Ouchy